Bradleyville may refer to:

 Bradleyville, Michigan, an unincorporated community in Tuscola County
 Bradleyville, Missouri, an unincorporated community in Taney County